Antoni Mikułko (born 26 June 2005) is a Polish professional footballer who plays as a goalkeeper for the Lechia Gdańsk.

Professional career
Mikułko is a youth product of Orlen Gdańsk and Lechia Gdańsk. In 2021, he was promoted to Lechia Gdańsk's senior team and started making appearances on the bench as the backup goalkeeper in the Ekstraklasa. On 27 June 2022, he extended his contract with the club until June 2025. In September 2022, he was named by English newspaper The Guardian as one of the best players born in 2005 worldwide.

International career
Mikułko is a youth international for Poland, having played with the Poland U16s, U17s, and U18s.

Playing style
Mikułko started playing football as a left winger before converting to goalkeeper.

References

External links
 
 90Minut profile

2005 births
Living people
Sportspeople from Gdańsk
Polish footballers
Poland youth international footballers
Association football goalkeepers
Lechia Gdańsk players